This is a list of notable patent attorneys and agents, including, in the section below, fictional patent attorneys.

A 
Charles Denton Abel (1831–1906), first vice-president of the Chartered Institute of Patent Attorneys

B 
Marcellus Bailey (1840–1921), 1870s U.S. law partner of Anthony Pollok who prepared telephone patents for Alexander Graham Bell
Alfred Ely Beach (1826–1896), inventor of the New York City Subway
Sharon Bowles (born 1953), British MEP

C 
Chester Carlson (1906–1968)
William Percy Carpmael (1853–1936), founder and first president of the rugby union Barbarian Football Club
Yardley Chittick (1900–2008)
Dennis Crouch (born 1975), professor at the University of Missouri School of Law and author of the widely read patent law blog Patently-O
George Ticknor Curtis (1812–1894)

D 
George Alfred DePenning, inventor to whom the first Indian patent was granted in 1856, and who later became the first patent agent in India
Peter Detkin

F 
Frederick Perry Fish, one of the leading patent attorneys in the late 19th century in America representing numerous high-profile clients from the Wright Brothers, General Electric, AT&T, founder of the intellectual property firm Fish & Richardson
Richard Frenkel, once-anonymous author of the Patent Troll Tracker blog

G 
Andrew C. Greenberg, co-creator of the Wizardry computer game
Edith Julia Griswold, in her day, she was the only woman patent expert

H 
G. Donald Harrison (1889–1956), builder of music organs
Walter de Havilland (1872-1968), father of film stars Olivia de Havilland and Joan Fontaine.
Ralph Horween (1896–1997), Harvard Crimson and NFL football player
Gerald D. Hosier, patent litigator, named highest-paid attorney by Forbes magazine in 2000

I 
John Imray (1820–1902), second president of the Chartered Institute of Patent Attorneys

J 
John Henry Johnson (1828–1900), first president of the Chartered Institute of Patent Attorneys

K 
Naoto Kan, Prime Minister of Japan (2010–2011)
Irving Kayton, former law professor, author of Kayton on Patents
 William ("Bill") Keefauver, formerly chief patent lawyer for Bell Labs; responsible for Gottschalk v. Benson, test case in which Bell Labs attempted (unsuccessfully) to get patent on algorithm; later Vice President and General Counsel of AT&T Bell Laboratories and Corporate Vice President – Law of AT&T with responsibility for intellectual property law matters
Florence King (1870–1924), first female patent attorney in America
Stephan Kinsella (born 1965), Libertarian legal theorist

L 
Otto Lee, mayor of Sunnyvale

M 
Alan MacPherson (1934–2008), the "dean of patent law" in Silicon Valley
Howard T. Markey (1921–2006), Chief Judge Court of Appeals for the Federal Circuit, Chicago patent lawyer, major general Air Force Reserve test pilot in World War II

N 
William Newton (1786–1861), one of the earliest recorded patent agents practising in London

P 
Anthony Pollok (1829–1898), 1870s US law partner of Marcellus Bailey who prepared telephone patents for Alexander Graham Bell

R 
Daniel Ravicher, Senior Counsel to the Free Software Foundation
Greg "Fossilman" Raymer (born 1964), winner of the main event at the 2004 World Series of Poker
Giles Sutherland Rich (1904–1999)
Malcolm Royal (1941–2006), Australian patent attorney and educator

S
Richard H. Stern (born 1931), Chief of U.S. Justice Department Patent Sec. (1970-1979), of counsel to government in Aro Mfg. Co. v. Convertible Top Replacement Co., Lear, Inc. v. Adkins, Gottschalk v. Benson, United States v. Glaxo Group Ltd., Dann v. Johnston, Parker v. Flook. Professorial Lecturer in Law, George Washington University Law School (since 1990).

T 
Harry Aubrey Toulmin, Sr. (1858–1942)
Timothy Tau - writer, filmmaker & law professor

W 
Günter Wächtershäuser, origin of life theorist
Thomas Blanco White, British patent lawyer; inductee to the IP (Intellectual property) Hall of Fame in 2010
Warren Woessner, poet and named partner of Schwegman, Lundberg & Woessner, P.A. 
John G. Wilson, founder of Wilson Gunn Patent and Trade Mark Attorneys

Fictional characters who are patent attorneys

Jim Eisenberg, played by Adam Arkin in the TV miniseries A Year in the Life
Oliver Farnsworth, from the novel The Man Who Fell to Earth; played by Buck Henry in its film adaptation, of the same name
Harriet Korn, played by Kathy Bates, of Harry's Law, a recently fired patent lawyer
Wally Mason, in the book Notes of a Patent Attorney: The Wally Mason Stories by Brian C. Coad
Eustis Miller, in the TV series King of the Hill; father of Bobby's classmate Randy
George Stobbart, from the Broken Sword adventure games
Harry Wykoff, in the six-hour mini-series Wild Palms
Calvin's father, in comic strip Calvin and Hobbes; the father of Bill Watterson, the creator of this cartoon series, is a patent attorney

See also 
 List of people associated with patent law

References 

Patent attorneys and agents, List of
 
Attorneys and agents